Belichy Island (Belichy Ostrov, literally: "Squirrel Island") is a narrow island in the northwestern Sea of Okhotsk, one of the Shantar Islands.

Geography
The island is 20.3 km in length, with a maximum width of about 5 km. It is covered in larch forests.

Belichy Island is separated from Bolshoy Shantar Island to the north by Proliv Severo-Vostochny, from Maly Shantar Island to the west by Proliv Opasny, and from the mainland to the south by Lindholm Strait. To its east lies Academy Bay.

History

Belichy was frequented by American whaleships hunting bowhead whales between 1857 and 1889.

References

Shantar Islands
Islands of the Sea of Okhotsk
Islands of the Russian Far East
Islands of Khabarovsk Krai